Luis Vasquez, better known by his stage name The Soft Moon, is an American musician, singer, songwriter, record producer, and composer. Vasquez serves as the lead vocalist, multi-instrumentalist, songwriter and sole official member of The Soft Moon, which he founded in 2009.

Early Life

Vasquez was born in Los Angeles, California, to a Cuban immigrant mother, and to a Mexican father who was never present in his life. At the age of 12 he and his family relocated to a small desert town called Victorville, California, where he showed an aptitude toward music and began playing guitar. At the age of 15 inspired by such bands as Bad Brains, Fugazi, Descendents, and Minor Threat, Vasquez formed his first punk rock band and states "I had to forge my mother's signature in order to play 18 & over clubs and ask for permission to stay the night at a friends house", one of those shows being the opening act for local band Face To Face. Vasquez played in several punk-rock bands throughout his teens, worked several odd jobs, and later moved to Oakland, California.

Career
In 2009 shortly after Vasquez created his project, Brooklyn based label Captured Tracks approached him with a record deal. In 2010 his first single "Breathe The Fire" followed by "Parallels" were released on 7" vinyl under the Captured Tracks imprint. Later that same year he released The Soft Moon's self-titled first full length album. Following the release, The Soft Moon went on their first world tour, soon later landing a US tour with Interpol.

In 2012 The Soft Moon released its second album Zeros. Vasquez has said in interviews that, upon finishing writing the album, he was robbed at gunpoint for his backpack which contained the finished album and had to completely re-write Zeros in a short amount of time to meet deadlines.

Vasquez moved abroad to Venice, Italy in 2013 to write his third album Deeper. Vasquez found himself working with a co-producer, Mauricio Baggio, for the first time. While writing Deeper, The Soft Moon landed a European tour with Depeche Mode which paused the writing process, later adding some influence and inspiration for the completion of the album.

in 2014 Vasquez relocated to Berlin, Germany where he began working on his fourth album, Criminal. The pressure of achieving lasting success with The Soft Moon, coupled with the chaos of Berlin life, resulted in his angriest and most frustrated material within The Soft Moon's discography.

In January 2023, a US show was announced: he will play at the Cruel World Festival in Pasadena, California on May 20, 2023.

Discography

Studio Albums 
 The Soft Moon (Captured Tracks, 2010)
 Zeros (Captured Tracks, 2012)
 Deeper (Captured Tracks, 2015)
 Criminal (Sacred Bones Records, 2018)
 A Body Of Errors (released as Luis Vasquez, 2021)
 Exister (Sacred Bones Records, 2022)

Remix Albums 
 Deeper Remixed Vol. 1 (LP)  - (Captured Tracks/aufnahme + wiedergabe, 2016)
 Deeper Remixed Vol. 2 (LP)  - (Captured Tracks/aufnahme + wiedergabe, 2016)
 Criminal Remixed Vol. 1 (LP)  - (Sacred Bones Records/aufnahme + wiedergabe, 2018)
 Criminal Remixed Vol. 2 (LP)  - (Sacred Bones Records/aufnahme + wiedergabe, 2018)

EPs 
 Total Decay (MLP/MCD) – (Captured Tracks, 2011)

Singles 
 "Breathe The Fire" (7") – (Captured Tracks, 2010)
 "Parallels" (7") – (Captured Tracks, 2010)
"Die Life" (2012)
"Insides" (2012)
 "Feel" (7"/cassette) – (self-released, 2014)
"Far" (2015)
"Wasting" (2015)
"Black" (2015)
"Want" (2015)
"Wrong" (2015)
"Burn" (2018)
"Choke" (2018)
"It Kills" (2018)
"Like A Father" (2018)
"Give Something" (2018)
"HIM (Feat. fish narc") (2022)
"Become The Lies" (2022)
"Monster" (2022)

Collaborations 
 "Evidence" (7") – with John Foxx and the Maths – (Captured Tracks, 2012)
"COLORS" (HEALTH x The Soft Moon") (Loma Vista, 2020)
"HIM" (Feat. fish narc") (Sacred Bones Records, 2022)
"Unforgiven" (Feat. Alli Logout") (Sacred Bones Records, 2022)

Remixes 
 Mogwai  - "San Pedro" (The Soft Moon Remix) (2012)
 How to Destroy Angels  - "Ice Age" (The Soft Moon Remix) (2012)
 Trentemøller  - "Complicated" (The Soft Moon Remix) (2016)
 Boy Harsher  – "Pain" (The Soft Moon Remix) (2018)
 Jakuzi  – "Ne teselli ne avuntu" (The Soft Moon Remix) (2019)
 She Past Away  – "Rituel" (The Soft Moon Remix) (2020)

Film & Television

Music Videos 

 "Parallels" (2010; edit of Hans Richter - "Rhythm 23" by Luis Vasquez)
 "Circles" (2010; dir. Luis Vasquez edited by Ron Robinson)
 "Total Decay" (2011; dir. Luis Vasquez and Ron Robinson. Produced and edited by Ron Robinson)
 "Machines" (2012; dir. Luis Vasquez edit of Ralph Steiner - "Mechanical Principles" edited by Ron Robinson)
 "Monster" (2022; dir. Bryan M. Ferguson)

Lineup
Although Vasquez writes, records, and produces alone, he is joined by other members for live performances.

Current
 Matteo Vallicelli – drums
 Luigi Pianezzola – bass guitar

Former
 Damon Way  – drum machine, sequencer, synthesizer
 Justin Anastasi – bass guitar
 Keven Tecon – drums

References

External links
 Official website

American post-punk music groups
Musical groups from Oakland, California
American noise rock music groups
American dark wave musical groups
Musical groups established in 2009
Sacred Bones Records artists
American industrial rock musical groups
Captured Tracks artists